The Waratah Bay is located in south Gippsland, Victoria. The bay is an arc of almost 20 kilometres of flat sandy beach framed by Cape Liptrap to the west and Wilsons Promontory in the east.

Surrounding townships

The townships of Sandy Point, Waratah Bay and Walkerville are all located on the bay. Because of its proximity to Wilsons Promontory, a wide variety of sealife can be found in the rockpools along the shoreline. Some of these include sea urchins, crabs and octopuses.

Attractions
There are resorts around the coast. In recent years, humpbacks, southern right whales and others are increasingly visiting the bay areas as whale numbers increase and re-colonize into their former habitat of Waratah Bay. Especially the right whales will be a big feature in winter to spring seasons as areas adjacent to Melbourne was used to be historical wintering/calving grounds. Endemic Burrunan dolphins and common dolphins that are resident in Port Phillip Bay may swim close to shores as well.

References

Bays of Victoria (Australia)